Weil am Rhein station is a small railway junction in Weil am Rhein in the German state of  Baden-Württemberg on the German-Swiss border. The Weil am Rhein–Lörrach railway (known as the Gartenbahn—"Garden Railway") branches off the Mannheim–Karlsruhe–Basel railway (Rhine Valley Railway) at the station.

History 

The Rhine Valley Railway was completed  in 1855 with the opening of the Haltingen–Basel section through Weil am Rhein. Weil am Rhein station was established at the same time.

The Weil am Rhine–Lörrach railway was opened on 20 May 1890 by the Grand Duchy of Baden State Railway as part of a strategic railway to bypass Switzerland. A railway line was had already been opened on 11 February 1878 between Weil am Rhein and Saint-Louis, providing a connection from Alsace (which had been captured from France in the Franco-Prussian War in 1870) to the far south of the German Empire.

The Basel-Weil marshalling yard was opened in 1913.

The Basel Badischer Bahnhof – Weil am Rhein – Efringen-Kirchen section of the Rhine Valley Railway and the whole of the Weil am Rhine–Lörrach railway were electrified in 1952.

The original station building was demolished in 1996.

The Weil am Rhine–Lörrach railway was included in the trinational Basel Regional S-Bahn as line S5 from the introduction of the 2004/2005 timetable on 12 December 2004. Services on the line have been operated since 15 June 2003 by SBB GmbH, the German subsidiary of the Swiss Federal Railways (SBB).

Since the timetable change in 2013/2014, SBB GmbH has operated a pair of trains on the Basel SBB – Weil am Rhein – Efringen-Kirchen route, closing an existing gap in the timetable to provide an hourly service.

Since the timetable change on 14 December 2014, Basel tram line 8 has run from its former terminus in Kleinhüningen via Friedlingen to Weil am Rhein station (Weil am Rhein Bahnhof/Zentrum tram stop).

Next to the passenger station is the now disused marshalling yard, which has been rebuilt as a container terminal.

Platforms 

Weil am Rhein station has an extensive system of tracks and platform facilities for passengers.

Between tracks 3 and 5 is track 4, which has no platform and is used for freight trains running through. Tracks 10 to 14, which also have no platforms, are abandoned; tracks 15 to 17 run to the Basel-Muttenz marshalling yard.

Transport services
Weil am Rhein is located in the fare zone of the Regio Verkehrsverbund Lörrach (Regional transport association of Lörrach, RVL). Tarifverbund Nordwestschweiz (tariff association of north-west Switzerland, TNW) fares are honoured towards Basel. Toward Freiburg, Regio Verkehrsverbund Lörrach fares apply from Auggen.

Long distance services

Since 13 December 2015, Weil am Rhein has been served by a daily InterCity service (the Baden-Kurier) on the route between Basel Bad and Munich.

Regional services 
The town is on line S5 line of Basel S-Bahn, which connects to Lörrach, Steinen, Schopfheim and Zell (Wiesental). Regional-Express and Regionalbahn services also connect with Basel, Freiburg and Offenburg. The S-Bahn and the Regional-Express services operate hourly and there are additional services in the peak hours.

Connections 

Tram line 8 connects Weil am Rhein station with Kleinhüningen and Basel's city centre at 15-minute intervals and since late 2014 the tramline has terminated on a bridge built parallel with the Friedensbrücke ("Peace Bridge") above Weil am Rhein station.

The Weil am Rhein Bahnhof/Zentrum bus stop is served by some local and regional buses operated by Südwestdeutsche Verkehrs-Aktiengesellschaft (SWEG). Bus route 55 provides another connection to Basel.

Notes

References

External links 

 Weil am Rhein layout 
 

Railway stations in Baden-Württemberg
Mannheim–Karlsruhe–Basel railway
Railway stations in Germany opened in 1855
1855 establishments in Baden
Buildings and structures in Lörrach (district)